Colborne is a surname. Notable people by that name include:

 Col Colborne (1909–1987), Australian politician.
 Francis Colborne (1817–1895), commander of British troops in China.
 Howie Colborne (born 1950), Canadian ice hockey player. 
 John Colborne, 1st Baron Seaton (1778–1863), British Army officer and colonial governor.
 Joe Colborne (born 1990), Canadian professional ice hockey forward.
 Michael Colborne (1934–2017), Royal Navy officer.
 Nicholas Ridley-Colborne, 1st Baron Colborne (1779–1854), British politician.
 William Colborne (1859–1945), member of the Queensland Legislative Council.